Coleophora bifurcella is a moth of the family Coleophoridae. It is found in Asia Minor and North Africa.

The larvae feed on Artemisia species. They feed on the leaves of their host plant.

References

bifurcella
Moths described in 1930
Moths of Asia
Moths of Africa